"Juliet" is the second single from Modern Talking's eleventh album, Victory. Unlike other Modern Talking tracks released previously, the song has a disco flavour to it and refers to Alicia Bridges's 1978 song "I Love the Nightlife".

Track listing 
CD-maxi, Hansa 74321 93836 2 (BMG) / EAN 0743219383624	29.04.2002
 "Juliet" - 3:37
 "Juliet" (Jeo's Remix) - 5:05
 "Higher Than Heaven" (U-Max Mix) - 3:40
 "Down on My Knees" - 3:42

Charts

References

External links

Modern Talking songs
2002 singles
Songs written by Dieter Bohlen
2002 songs